The second season of the American television drama series Breaking Bad premiered on March 8, 2009 and concluded on May 31, 2009. It consisted of 13 episodes, each running approximately 47 minutes in length. AMC broadcast the second season on Sundays at 10:00 pm in the United States. The complete second season was released on Region 1 DVD and Region A Blu-ray on March 16, 2010.

Cast

Main
 Bryan Cranston as Walter White, a terminally ill high school chemistry teacher in Albuquerque, New Mexico. Walt runs a drug business with his partner Jesse.
 Anna Gunn as Skyler White, Walt's pregnant wife and a bookkeeper for the firm Beneke Fabricators.
 Aaron Paul as Jesse Pinkman, a laid-back, small-time drug dealer and cooker who is in partnership with Walter White.
 Dean Norris as Hank Schrader, Walt and Skyler's brother-in-law and a DEA agent.
 Betsy Brandt as Marie Schrader, Skyler's sister and Hank's wife.
 RJ Mitte as Walter White Jr., Walt and Skyler's teenage son, who has cerebral palsy.

Recurring

Episodes

The titles of the first, fourth, tenth, and thirteenth episodes form a sentence that reveals an event that takes place in the season finale (Seven Thirty-Seven Down Over ABQ).

Production
The writers of Breaking Bad planned the storyline for the entire season in advance of filming and knew how the season would end right from the beginning. That differed from subsequent seasons, in which the writers did not have a complete plan and developed the storyline as the episodes progressed. Series creator Vince Gilligan said of season two, "That came about through many, many hours of beating our heads against the wall—very laborious work, which is probably why we haven't repeated that formula since."

Music
The original score for Breaking Bad was composed by Dave Porter. The show also uses music from other recording artists with music supervision by Thomas Golubić. Selected songs from Season 2 are featured on the Breaking Bad soundtrack available through iTunes and Amazon.

Home video releases
The second season was released on DVD in Region 1 and Blu-ray in Region A on March 16, 2010. It was released on DVD in Region 2 on July 26, 2010 and in Region 4 on February 8, 2010.

Reception

Reviews
The second season of Breaking Bad received very positive reviews from critics, scoring 84 out of 100 on Metacritic. On review aggregator Rotten Tomatoes, the second season has an approval rating of 97% based on 35 reviews, with an average rating of 9.16/10. The site's critics consensus reads: "Breaking Bad continues to soar, thanks to its artsy style and suspenseful thrills." Entertainment Weekly critic Ken Tucker stated "Bad is a superlatively fresh metaphor for a middle-age crisis: It took cancer and lawbreaking to jolt Walt out of his suburban stupor, to experience life again—to take chances, risk danger, do things he didn't think himself capable of doing. None of this would work, of course, without Emmy winner Cranston's ferocious, funny selflessness as an actor. For all its bleakness and darkness, there's  a glowing exhilaration about this series: It's a feel-good show about feeling really bad." San Francisco Chronicle'''s Tim Goodman claimed "The first three episodes of Season 2 that AMC sent out continue that level of achievement with no evident missteps. In fact, it looks as if Gilligan's bold vision for Breaking Bad, now duly rewarded against all odds, has invigorated everyone involved in the project. You can sense its maturity and rising ambition in each episode." Horror novelist Stephen King lauded the series, comparing it to Twin Peaks and Blue Velvet. Alan Sepinwall of The Star-Ledger praised the season, calling it "brilliant". He lauded the sound design as well as the cinematography, enjoying the "emphasis of beautiful desert vistas and disturbing tableaux". He also compared the series to The Sopranos, more specifically on the similarity of Walter White and Tony Soprano and their respective reactions to similar situations. David Hinckley of the New York Daily News'' praised Cranston's performance of Walter White calling him "one of the best played characters on television".

Awards and nominations
The second season received numerous awards and nominations, including five Primetime Emmy Award nominations with two wins. Bryan Cranston won his second consecutive award for Outstanding Lead Actor in a Drama Series and Lynne Willingham won her second consecutive award for Outstanding Single-Camera Picture Editing for a Drama Series for "ABQ". The series received its first nomination for Outstanding Drama Series, Aaron Paul received his first nomination for Outstanding Supporting Actor in a Drama Series, and Michael Slovis was nominated for Outstanding Cinematography for a One Hour Series for "ABQ".

Cranston won the Television Critics Association Award for Individual Achievement in Drama, with the series being nominated for Outstanding Achievement in Drama. Cranston won his second consecutive Satellite Award for Best Actor in a Drama Series, with the series winning the award for Best Drama Series. Aaron Paul won the Saturn Award for Best Supporting Actor on Television, with the series winning the award for Best Syndicated/Cable Television Series. The series received two Writers Guild of America Award nominations, for Best Drama Series, and John Shiban for Best Episodic Drama for "Phoenix".

References

External links

 

 
2009 American television seasons
2
Television series set in 2008
Television series set in 2009